Arunodoyer Agnishakkhi is a 1972 Bangladeshi film based on the Liberation war of Bangladesh directed by Subhash Dutta. Babita, Ujjal and Anwar Hossain played the three lead roles.

Plot

Cast
 Bobita
 Anwar Hossain
 Subhash Dutta
 Uzzal
 Masud
 Khokan
 Ahmed Sharif
 Abul Hayat

References

Bengali-language Bangladeshi films
1972 films
Films based on the Bangladesh Liberation War
Films scored by Satya Saha
1970s Bengali-language films
Films directed by Subhash Dutta